Odarwa is a village in West Champaran district in the Indian state of Bihar.

Demographics
As of 2011 India census, Odarwa had a population of 2235 in 312 households. Males constitute 52.6% of the population and females 47.3%. Odarwa has an average literacy rate of 33.6%, lower than the national average of 74%: male literacy is 70.6%, and female literacy is 29.3%. In Odarwa, 21.7% of the population is under 6 years of age.

References

Villages in West Champaran district